Mass graves in Škofja Loka were created in Škofja Loka, Slovenia during and after the Second World War. The Commission on Concealed Mass Graves in Slovenia has registered seven known mass graves in the city itself and an additional 20 in the Municipality of Škofja Loka.

Background

The concealed mass graves in Škofja Loka were created in the immediate aftermath of the Second World War, after British forces forcibly repatriated Home Guard soldiers that had fled to Austria to Yugoslavia from camps in Bleiburg, Lavamund, Rosenbach, Viktring (a district of Klagenfurt),  and elsewhere. They are part of the mass graves associated with the nearby former Loka Castle prison, where Home Guard members and civilians that did not flee to Austria were also killed en masse. The Skofja Loka prison has been characterized as an extermination camp that was also used for torture.

List of mass graves
Škofja Loka is the site of seven known mass graves from the period immediately after the Second World War. Two additional mass graves connected with these are located in neighboring Vincarje. An unknown number of Home Guard prisoners of war and Slovene civilians, and possibly victims of other nationalities, were murdered and buried at several sites in and around Loka Castle.
The Loka Castle Yard Mass Grave, also known as the Castle Dance Floor Mass Grave, is located in the castle park.
The Castle Wall 1 Mass Grave is located in a meadow on a slope about  outside the wall of Loka Castle, in Vincarje. It contains the remains of an unknown number of Home Guard prisoners of war and Slovene civilians, and possibly victims of other nationalities.
The Castle Wall 2–6 mass graves are located around the castle perimeter. Grave number two lies in a meadow by the southwest corner of the castle wall and the remains of five victims were discovered at the site in December 2006. The third grave lies on the inside of the southwest corner of the wall. The fourth grave is in a meadow next to the tree-lined boulevard. The fifth grave is on the left side of the path next to the wall. The sixth grave is to the right, below the path.
The Viršk Field Mass Grave is located on the southern edge of the town, between the Poljane Sora River and the road to Gorenja Vas, near two bunkers. It contained the remains of an unknown number of German prisoners of war. It is believed that the remains were disinterred after the war.
It contains the remains of 20 German prisoners of war that died or were murdered in the summer of 1945. The remains may have been exhumed.

Other mass graves
Additional mass graves in the Municipality of Škofja Loka are located in Bodovlje, Breznica pod Lubnikom, Crngrob, Dobruška Vas, Gabrovo, Križna Gora, Pevno, Puštal, Sopotnica, Trnje, and Vešter.

References

Mass graves in Slovenia
Aftermath of World War II in Slovenia
Massacres in Slovenia
World War II prisoner of war massacres
Massacres in Yugoslavia